Pony Up is an all-woman Canadian indie pop band based in Montreal, Quebec. They are known for their guitar-and-keyboard based upbeat music and their personal and sometimes sexually suggestive lyrics.

History
Pony Up! was formed on New Year's Eve 2002. The members were bassist Lisa Smith, drummer Lindsay Wills, keyboardist Laura Wills, guitarist Sarah Moundroukas, and vocalist Camilla Wynne Ingr. The group released their debut, self-titled EP, Pony Up! (which included their song "Matthew Modine") in 2005, via Steve Aoki's label, Dim Mak. 

In April 2006, Pony Up released their first full-length album, Make Love to the Judges with Your Eyes. To promote their debut, the band toured Australia in the summer of 2006, where their single "The Truth About Cats and Dogs (Is That They Die)" would later be voted No. 47 on Triple J's Hottest 100.

In September 2008 Pony Up supported The Mountain Goats on tour. Lisa Smith and Laura Wills joined the touring lineup of The Dears.

The band's third album, Stay Gold, was released in the spring of 2009.

Discography
 Pony Up! (2005, EP)
 Make Love to the Judges with Your Eyes (2006)
 Stay Gold (2009)

Band members

Current members
 Lisa J. Smith – bass guitar
 Lindsay Wills – drums
 Laura Wills – keyboards and vocals
 Sarah Moundroukas – guitar and vocals

Former members
 Camilla Wynne Ingr - also in the band Sunset Rubdown

Music videos

References

External links 
 Not Just Another Girl Band: The Pony Up Interview by Michael Mercadante 2006

Musical groups established in 2002
Musical groups from Montreal
Canadian indie pop groups
All-female bands
English-language musical groups from Quebec
2002 establishments in Quebec